Rhopalovalva ovata is a species of moth of the family Tortricidae. It is found in China (Henan, Hunan).

The wingspan is about 14 mm. The forewings are uniform pale yellow, with eight pairs of grey streaks on the costa. The hindwings are grey.

Etymology
The specific name refers to the nearly ovate socius in the male genitalia and is derived from Latin ovatus (meaning oval).

References

Moths described in 2004
Eucosmini